Hingley is a surname. Notable people with the surname include:

Anna Hingley (born 1982), Australian adventurer 
Benjamin Hingley (1830–1905), English ironmaster and Liberal politician
George Benjamin Hingley (1850–1918), English industrialist
Noah Hingley (1796–1877), English industrialist 
Robert "Bucket" Hingley, British musician 
Ronald Hingley (1920–2010), English scholar, translator and historian
Tom Hingley (born 1965), British musician

See also
Hingley baronets, British Baronetage 

Surnames of British Isles origin